Lvzbel was a Mexican heavy metal band from Mexico City, Mexico. The band was formed by Arturo Huizar in 1998. The band was created after the breakup of Luzbel due to differences between Raul Greñas, guitarist and founder of Luzbel, and vocalist Huizar. The change of the "u" to a "v" was due to legal issues with Greñas. Huizar, and many fans, consider Lvzbel as a continuation of Luzbel. Huizar is able to perform old Luzbel songs in shows because he wrote most of them; even old Luzbel albums are shown in the band's website as part of their discography.

Biography
After legal problems with the name and personal differences with Huizar, Raul Fernandez Greñas disbanded Luzbel. In 1996 Arturo Huizar founded Lvzbel with Richard III as lead guitarist, Alejandro Vazquez on the drums (not on the recordings), Guillermo Elizarraras on the rhythm guitar, Carlos Hernandez on the bass, and Ivan Ramirez on the drums. After extensive production, Evangelio Nocturno was recorded in 1998. The album included songs like "Angel de Sodoma", "El Hambre" and "Bienvenidos al Apocalipsis". The album was received well by fans. In 1999 Lvzbel appeared  performing songs from the old band in Vivo y Desnudo Vol 1 and Vol 2, an album recorded live at the Rockotitlán music festival. Lvzbel composed the soundtrack of the film Guerrero Callejero and released an album called Pistas Musicales, the latter which disappointed many fans as it turned out to be a remake of his previous album. In 2000 they released Tiempo De La Bestia, with a great deal of distribution in Mexico, Central America, South America and the southern United States. In the spring of 2004 tribute album to Judas Priest was released. Among the covers are, Painkiller, Ram it Down, Breaking the Law and other popular Judas Priest songs. In 2007 they released Tentaciones, a conceptual album of the 7 Deadly Sins. For Tentaciones, Huizar was able to reunite the old Luzbel band, except Greñas, to participate in recording the album. Arturo Huizar (born September 5, 1957) passed away on April 25, 2020 due to diabetes-related complications at the age of 62.Discography
AlbumsEvangelio Nocturno (1998)Tiempo de la Bestia (2000)Mirada Electrica (2004)Tentaciones'' (2007)

References

External links
Facebook

Mexican heavy metal musical groups
Musical groups from Mexico City